Tempest is the thirteenth studio album by San Francisco band Tussle. It was released in October 2012 under Smalltown Supersound records, and produced by J.D. Twitch of Optimo

Track listing

References

2012 albums
Smalltown Supersound albums